William Henry Baker (October 26, 1882 – February 11, 1916) was a Canadian professional ice hockey player. He played with the Montreal Shamrocks of the National Hockey Association.

References

1882 births
1916 deaths
Anglophone Quebec people
Canadian ice hockey goaltenders
Montreal Shamrocks players
Ice hockey people from Montreal